The Circuit de Lorraine is a multi-stage road bicycle racing event held annually in Lorraine, France. Since 2005, it has been organised as a 2.1 event on the UCI Europe Tour.

Between 1956 and 1994 it was an amateur race, becoming a professional race called Circuit des Mines in 1995.

Winners

External links
 Conseil Régional de Lorraine site 
 Palmarès by Memoire-du-cyclisme.net

UCI Europe Tour races
Cycle races in France
Recurring sporting events established in 1956
1956 establishments in France